Ashton is a city in eastern Spink County, South Dakota, United States. The population was 108 at the 2020 census.

History
Ashton was founded in 1879, but it was moved and replatted on the current site in 1881 in order to be located on a new railroad line. The town most likely takes its name after Ashton, England. A post office called Ashton has been in operation since 1879.

Geography
Ashton is located at  (44.994523, -98.498577).

Ashton has been assigned the ZIP code 57424, and the FIPS place code 02540.

Demographics

2010 census
As of the census of 2010, there were 122 people, 52 households, and 37 families residing in the city. The racial makeup of the city was 100.0% White. Hispanic or Latino of any race were 4.9% of the population.

There were 52 households, of which 32.7% had children under the age of 18 living with them, 53.8% were married couples living together, 13.5% had a female householder with no husband present, 3.8% had a male householder with no wife present, and 28.8% were non-families. 28.8% of all households were made up of individuals, and 11.6% had someone living alone who was 65 years of age or older. The average household size was 2.35 and the average family size was 2.84.

The median age in the city was 43.7 years. 24.6% of residents were under the age of 18; 5.7% were between the ages of 18 and 24; 22.1% were from 25 to 44; 32.8% were from 45 to 64; and 14.8% were 65 years of age or older. The gender makeup of the city was 54.9% male and 45.1% female.

2000 census
As of the census of 2000, there were 152 people, 61 households, and 45 families residing in the city. The population density was 342.4 people per square mile (133.4/km2). There were 72 housing units at an average density of 162.2 per square mile (63.2/km2). The racial makeup of the city was 100.00% White.

There were 61 households, out of which 29.5% had children under the age of 18 living with them, 59.0% were married couples living together, 11.5% had a female householder with no husband present, and 26.2% were non-families. 21.3% of all households were made up of individuals, and 9.8% had someone living alone who was 65 years of age or older. The average household size was 2.49 and the average family size was 2.91.

In the city, the population was spread out, with 30.3% under the age of 18, 2.0% from 18 to 24, 25.7% from 25 to 44, 25.0% from 45 to 64, and 17.1% who were 65 years of age or older. The median age was 39 years. For every 100 females, there were 100.0 males. For every 100 females age 18 and over, there were 96.3 males.

The median income for a household in the city was $25,625, and the median income for a family was $36,875. Males had a median income of $21,719 versus $20,179 for females. The per capita income for the city was $12,283. There were 5.4% of families and 6.3% of the population living below the poverty line, including 6.4% of under eighteens and none of those over 64.

See also
 List of cities in South Dakota

References

External links

Cities in South Dakota
Cities in Spink County, South Dakota